Terra Vibe is a park in Attica, Greece, which is used as a venue for large-scale outdoor events, such as concerts and festivals.

In 2010, the Sonisphere Festival took place and the Big Four of thrash metal performed with headliners Metallica.

Mötley Crüe were due to play Rockwave in 2009 as part of the Crüe Fest tour but due to heavy rain in the Malakasa area, the venue was ruled unsafe and the event cancelled. Lauren Harris was support.  The rain eventually stopped in time for the final day of the festival when Slipknot headlined.

The venue has hosted many festivals and some them are the annual Rockwave Festival, Sonisphere Festival 2010, Terra Vibe Festival and many artists have performed there not only as part of a festival

Artists who have performed at Terra Vibe

2004

W.A.S.P.
Soulfly
Dark Tranquillity
Firewind
Judas Priest
Nightwish
Queensrÿche
Placebo
HIM

2005

Duran Duran
Iron Maiden
Black Sabbath
Velvet Revolver
Black Label Society
DragonForce
Marilyn Manson
Moby
Slayer
Accept
Candlemass
Twisted Sister
Dio
Anthrax
The Cure
Korn

2006:

Sting
Roger Waters
Guns N' Roses
Depeche Mode
Placebo
Twisted Sister
Crimson Glory
Moonspell
W.A.S.P. did not perform, due to health problems of lead singer/guitarist Blackie Lawless.

2007:

Robert Plant & The Strange Sensation
Chris Cornell
Europe
Heaven And Hell
Dream Theater
Iced Earth
Metallica
Mastodon
My Dying Bride
Tool
Muse
Manic Street Preachers

2008:

Iron Maiden
Judas Priest
KISS
Kylie Minogue
Opeth
Within Temptation
Morbid Angel
Cavalera Conspiracy
The Offspring
Patti Smith
Linkin Park
Siouxsie
DEUS
Marky Ramone
The Gossip
Carcass
Innerwish
Manu Chao
Leonard Cohen
Lenny Kravitz

2009:
Deep Purple
The Killers
Slipknot
Duffy
Moby
Mastodon
Gogol Bordello
Linkin Park
Tokio Hotel
Depeche Mode did not perform, due to health problems of lead singer Dave Gahan.

2010:
Bob Dylan
Metallica
Slayer
Megadeth
Anthrax
Bullet For My Valentine
Stone Sour
Suicidal Angels
Rammstein
Combichrist
The Black Eyed Peas
Massive Attack
Fatboy Slim
Faithless
Gogol Bordello
Ska-P
Jethro Tull
Diana Krall
Serj Tankian
Placebo
Ozzy Osbourne

2011
Roxette
Iron Maiden
Slipknot
Mastodon
Gojira
The Prodigy
Gogol Bordello
Kyuss
Monster Magnet
Therapy?
Editors
Sivert Hoyem
The Stranglers
flogging molly
Dream Theater

2013
Depeche Mode
Lana Del Rey (as part of the Rockwave Festival)
The Subways (as part of the Rockwave Festival)
Echo & the Bunnymen (as part of the Rockwave Festival)

2015
The Black Keys
The Black Angels
Robbie Williams
The Prodigy
Judas Priest
Rotting Christ
Black Rebel Motorcycle Club
Manu Chao
Black Label Society
Thirty Seconds to Mars

2016
The Last Shadow Puppets
Dropkick Murphys
Suede
Lana Del Rey
Turbonegro
Allah-alas

2017
Depeche Mode
Placebo
Evanescence
Gojira
flogging molly
Sivert Høyem

External links
Terra Vibe

Music venues in Greece
Tourist attractions in Attica
Buildings and structures in Attica